Sidney Derrick Harris is a former professional American football player who played running back for four seasons for the St. Louis Rams and San Diego Chargers.

Harris had two receiving touchdowns for the 1998 St. Louis Rams; he had twelve of his career thirteen NFL catches in 1998. His other and final NFL touchdown came when he returned a blocked punt at New England on October 14, 2001, giving San Diego a 26–16 lead.  (New England came back, tying the game in the final minute and then winning in overtime.  The game-winning 46 yard field goal was the first of three overtime game winners for Adam Vinatieri during the 2001 regular season and playoffs.  With the win, New England climbed to 2–3, barely avoiding a 1–4 start.  The game marked the first come from behind win in Tom Brady's career, but the blocked punt, and his reaction to it, resulted in punter Lee Johnson's release following the game.  Just four games earlier, Johnson had become the all-time leader in punting yardage, a feat made possible by some inferior Cincinnati Bengals and New England Patriots offenses over the course of Johnson's career.) Harris played in all 16 games with the 2001 Chargers, but would not play in the NFL again after 2001.

1972 births
Living people
People from Angleton, Texas
Players of American football from Texas
American football running backs
Miami Hurricanes football players
St. Louis Rams players
San Diego Chargers players